Yorkin River is a river of Costa Rica and Panama.

References

Rivers of Costa Rica